HGE may refer to:
 Hemorrhagic gastroenteritis
 Hughes Glomar Explorer, a drillship
 Human granulocytic ehrlichiosis, today called human anaplasmosis
 Haaf's Game Engine, a DirectX based 2D game engine utilizing Direct3D for Windows